Cynthia Marie Kirchner (born April 21, 1982) is an American actress and fashion model, best known for her role as Bardot in the film Hot Bot, her appearance in the Guess campaign shot by Ellen Von Unwerth, her various advertisements and commercials for L'Oreal, and her lingerie pictures for Victoria's Secret, Frederick's of Hollywood, La Senza, Warner's, Vassarette, and Christian Lacroix Kirchner's first television role was playing the recurring character Grace on The Bold and the Beautiful. She made her feature film debut as Bardot in the Polish brothers film Hot Bot, and as Kopen in Abstraction with director Daniel James Gomes.

Early life

Kirchner was born in Brooklyn, New York, the daughter of Monica Goldstein and Francis Kirchner. She has four brothers, Billy, Patrick, Roger, and Timothy, and one sister, Jessica. She started singing, dancing and acting at age 3. She also taught herself to read at age four. She was accepted into the Hunter College High School at age twelve, but never attended as she moved to Hazleton, Pennsylvania with her father, sister, and step-mother Arlene Ochner. There she attended Hazleton Area High School, where she graduated with honors, received an award from the Presidential Scholars Program, and earned an academic scholarship to Chestnut Hill College in Philadelphia, Pennsylvania. In 2000, moved across the country to Los Angeles, California where she stayed until 2002. In 2002, she relocated back to New York to continue pursuing her modeling career and her academic studies at New York University and Neighborhood Playhouse School of Theatre. She also graduated from the Hollywood Film Institute on September 29, 2013, where she focused on producing, writing and directing.

Career

Kirchner has been featured in pictorials in Elle, Italian Vogue, Glamour with Terry Richardson and was featured on the cover of Cosmopolitan. She is best known for her work as a model for Guess, Intimissimi and Victoria's Secret. She has appeared in music videos for Enrique Iglesias and Justin Timberlake.

She began her modeling career in 2002 when she was discovered by Kenya Knight at Nous Model Management in Los Angeles. In her first week, Kirchner booked Guess? and worked with Bruce Weber for Abercrombie and Fitch. From there she went to Milan, Italy where she booked campaigns and appeared on FashionTV's Model Flat. While in Milan, Kirchner was scouted by Kwok Chan and signed with Marilyn Agency NY and Marilyn Agency Paris modeling agencies. In the Fall of 2002, she moved to New York.

While in New York, Kirchner was cast in a lead role of the independent film Blue Tuesday with director Chad Johansen in 2003. She then started formal acting training with Sheila Grey. She continued her acting studies at the Neighborhood Playhouse School of Theatre, where she worked with the Meisner technique under Richard Pinter and Gary King. In 2008, Kirchner appeared in another independent film, 100% Perfect Girl with director Jonathan Jacobs. Also in 2008, she appeared in the feature film, Ghosts of Girlfriends Past starring Matthew McConaughey, Michael Douglas, Jennifer Garner, and Emma Stone with director Mark Waters and was cast in the recurring role of Grace on the soap opera The Bold and the Beautiful.

In 2011, Kirchner was the lead as Kopen in Abstraction with director Daniel James Gomes and was featured alongside Jim Carrey in Mr. Popper's Penguins with director Mark Waters. She was also the lead in the Brothers Strause production of Seventh Tear and Michael Ojeda's Sex, Lies and Alibis. Kirchner started off 2012 as the lead role of "Bardot" in the Polish brothers film Hot Bot along with Larry Miller, Anthony Anderson, Angela Kinsey, Danny Masterson and Donald Faison. In June 2012, she starred in a limited engagement performance of the two-person John Patrick Shanley play Danny and the Deep Blue Sea directed by Allan Rich and worked on several Shakespeare pieces at Theatricum Botanicum.

In January 2015, Kirchner founded Supermodel University and Hollywood Academy of the Arts. In May 2015, Kirchner associate produced Things Happen with Director David S. Dawson. In June 2015, she appeared alongside Rhys Coiro inEntourage film, by director Doug Ellin. Kirchner is currently featured alongside Hugh Laurie in a L'oreal commercial and solo in a Pantene commercial. Cynthia spent the end of 2015 and beginning half of 2016 pursuing her doctoral studies and completing coursework at Columbia University in New York. Kirchner studies at the Penny Templeton Studio in New York and with Michelle Danner at the Larry Moss (acting coach)  Larry Moss Studio in Los Angeles. In 2020, Cynthia produced, directed and hosted the TV series Comedy Parlour Live: Quarantine Edition, which was presented by Damon Dash. The series currently streams on Fox Soul. In 2020, Cynthia co-created Nin Nin Do with TaeBo legend Billy Blanks. In late 2021 Kirchner received her MBA from the John E. Simon School Of Business. Nin Nin Do is set to debut in late 2022.

Filmography

References

External links

 Official website
 
 

1987 births
Female models from New York (state)
American film actresses
American television actresses
Living people
Actresses from New York City
People from Hazleton, Pennsylvania
People from Brooklyn
21st-century American women